Ek Yi Oun (1910 – 2013) was a Cambodian politician and a member of the Sangkum party who served as the Prime Minister of Cambodia from 11 January until 17 January 1958. With a term of six days, he remains the shortest-served Prime Minister of Cambodia to date. He served as acting President of the National Assembly of Cambodia in 1970.

References

1910 births
2013 deaths
20th-century Cambodian politicians
Cambodian centenarians
Prime Ministers of Cambodia
Presidents of the National Assembly (Cambodia)
Sangkum politicians
Men centenarians
Date of birth missing
Date of death missing
Place of death missing